Drottningviken is the name of a small bay in Nynäshamn, Sweden.  The bay is a popular training ground among scuba divers in the Nynäshamn and Stockholm regions, due to its shallow and accessible waters.

Bays of Sweden
Landforms of Stockholm County